Violetta Vladimirovna Khrapina (born 18 March 1994) is a Russian épée fencer.

She participated at the 2019 World Fencing Championships, winning a medal.

References

External links

1994 births
Living people
Russian female épée fencers
Olympic fencers of Russia
Competitors at the 2017 Summer Universiade
Fencers at the 2020 Summer Olympics
21st-century Russian women